Homer Ray Oldfield Jr. (August 28, 1916 – June 22, 2000), also known as Barney Oldfield, was an American computer professional best known for his work at General Electric in the 1940s and 50s.

Oldfield was born in Mount Vernon, New York on August 28, 1916. He attended Massachusetts Institute of Technology, where he received a BS in Aeronautical Engineering in 1938, and an MS in Instrumentation in 1939.

From 1939 to 1941 he worked as a research associate at the MIT Instrument Laboratory. In 1941 he joined the US Army where he worked on microwave antiaircraft radar. In 1945 he joined General Electric as a sales manager. From 1950 to 1952 to he was operations manager of the GE Advanced Electronics Center at Cornell University, where he also served as visiting professor. From 1952 to 1955 he directed the GE Microwave Laboratory at Stanford University. At Stanford he participated in development of an early computer system, Electronic Recording Machine, Accounting (ERMA), developed by SRI International for Bank of America in the early 1950s. This system was manufactured by General Electric, and sold as the GE-100.

In 1956, Oldfield was promoted to General Manager of GE's Computer Department in Phoenix, Arizona. In Phoenix he attempted to push GE further into the computer business, in the face of opposition from higher management. He left GE in 1958.

After GE Oldfield went on to positions at Raytheon, DASA Corporation, Searle Medidata, and Medidata Health Services, of which he was part owner.
He is a Fellow of the Institute of Radio Engineers, a fellow of the International Health Evaluation Association, and a member of the American Medical Informatics Association. In 1997 he received the Computer Pioneer Award from the IEEE  "For pioneering work in the development of banking applications through the implementation of ERMA, and the introduction of computer manufacturing to GE."

In 1996 Oldfield published a book, King of the Seven Dwarfs: General Electric's ambiguous challenge to the computer industry, about his experiences at GE.

Oldfield died in Bradenton, Florida on June 22, 2000, at the age of 83.

References

External Links
H.R. Oldfield Collection of General Electric Corporation Records at the Charles Babbage Institute
Snively's corrections to King of the Seven Dwarfs

1916 births
2000 deaths
General Electric employees
Massachusetts Institute of Technology alumni
People from Mount Vernon, New York